Akimi Kawafune (born 25 December 2003) is a Japanese professional footballer who plays as a forward for WE League club AC Nagano Parceiro Ladies.

Club career 
Kawafune made her WE League debut on 12 September 2021.

References 

Living people
2003 births
Women's association football forwards
WE League players
Japanese women's footballers
Association football people from Nagano Prefecture
AC Nagano Parceiro Ladies players